Desert Warrior is a 1957 Italian-Spanish adventure film directed by Goffredo Alessandrini, Fernando Cerchio, León Klimovsky and Gianni Vernuccio and starring Carmen Sevilla, Ricardo Montalbán and Gino Cervi.

The film had a difficult production process. Some scenes were shot on location in Cairo, but this coincided with the outbreak of the Suez Crisis. The film's sets were designed by the art directors Sigfrido Burmann and Mario Garbuglia.

Plot 
Ibrahim is a despot with ambitions – he wants to bring peace to the kingdom of Kamal, even if it is by assassinating all his opponents. With the help of his less than trustworthy subordinate Selim, he manages to ensure that nobody even dares to utter any objections; nor the rightful ruler, Sultan Omar, or his son Prince Said. However, the latter plans a plot against Ibrahim. In order to raise the necessary money, Said and his men raid caravans. During one such raid, he meets Princess Amina, the despot's daughter, who pretends to be a dancer. Amina falls in love with him, which poses problems for her father, who has promised her in marriage to Selim. Said and his people succeed in ousting Ibrahim from the throne and happily ends with Amina.

Cast
 Carmen Sevilla as Princess Amina
 Ricardo Montalbán as Prince Said
 Gino Cervi as Ibrahim
 José Guardiola as Kamal
 Franca Bettoia as Suleika
 Manuel Guitián
 Domingo Rivas
 Manuel Alcón
 Mariangela Giordano
 Joaquín Bergía
 Félix Briones
 Pilar Gómez Ferrer

References

Bibliography

External links 
 

1957 films
1957 adventure films
CinemaScope films
Spanish adventure drama films
Italian adventure drama films
1950s Italian-language films
1950s Spanish-language films
Films directed by Goffredo Alessandrini
Films directed by Fernando Cerchio
Films directed by León Klimovsky
Films scored by Michel Michelet
Films shot in Egypt
Films set in deserts
Films directed by Gianni Vernuccio
1950s Italian films